Ekaterina Valerievna Krysanova is a Russian principal dancer of Bolshoi Ballet.

Biography
Krysanova was born in Moscow, Russia in 1985. Her mother took her to ballet lessons when she was 8. She began studying ballet at the Galina Vishnevskaya Opera Singing Center (Moscow) in 1995, then continued her studies at the Moscow State Choreographic School. L.M. Lavrovsky (teachers Galina Krapivina, Nina Speranskaya), and in 2001 - at the Moscow State Academy of Choreography (class of Tatiana Galtseva). She received a gold medal in 2001 at the Prix de Luxembourg International Ballet Competition and the same year was awarded a bronze in the Junior Competition. In 2002 she was awarded another bronze in Saint Petersburg and the same year attended Bolshoi Ballet Academy from which she graduated in 2003. In the same year, she became a member of the Bolshoi Ballet. She was promoted to the rank of soloist in 2006, became a first soloist in 2008 and by 2009 had been promoted to Leading Soloist under the direction of Svetlana Adyrkhaeva, appearing with the Bavarian State Opera. On 3 December 2011, after a performance of The Bright Stream, Krysanova (who played the role of Zina) reached the rank of Principal. She had appeared in such works as In the Upper Room of Twyla Tharp, Class Concert, Bolt by Alexei Ratmansky, Cinque, Russian Seasons, Ondine and many other contemporary works. Her first soloist role was as the Spanish Doll in The Nutcracker and was followed by the Fairy of Audacity in Sleeping Beauty, as well as many other memorable roles, most of which were produced by Yuri Grigorovich.

In 2017, Krysanova appeared in The Taming of the Shrew at the David H. Koch Theater and in 2018 she performed in Don Quixote.

Repertoire
2003

Spanish Doll (Nutcracker by P. Tchaikovsky, choreography by Y. Grigorovich)

2004

'two couples' in Part 3, Soloist Part 3 (Symphony in C to music by G. Bizet, choreography by G. Balanchine)
1st variation in The Shadows (L. Minkus' La Bayadere, choreography by M. Petipa, Y. Grigorovich's version)
Part in Passacaille to music by A. von Webern (choreography by R. Petit)
Fairy of Audacity (The Sleeping Beauty by P. Tchaikovsky, choreography by Y. Grigorovich)
1st pas de trois (Agon by I. Stravinsky, choreography by G. Balanchine)
Girls (Magrittomania to music by Y. Krasavin, choreography by Y. Possokhov) — creation at Bolshoi Theatre
Guadalquivir (C. Pugni's La Fille du Pharaon, choreography by P. Lacotte after M. Petipa)

2005

A. Ratmansky)
Grand Pas variation, 2nd variation in Raimonda's Dreams (Raymonda by A. Glazunov, choreography by M. Petipa, Y. Grigorovich's version)
Friend/friends to Shireen (A. Melikov's A Legend of Love, choreography by Y. Grigorovich)
A. Ratmansky)
Temptation (Les Presages to music by P. Tchaikovsky, choreography by L. Massine)
Friend/friends to the Prince, Polish Bride (Swan Lake by P. Tchaikovsky, Y. Grigorovich's second version)
Soloist in Part 4 (Symphony in C)
Dryad/Three Dryads, 1st Variation in Grand Pas (L. Minkus' Don Quixote, choreography by M. Petipa, A. Gorsky, A. Fadeyechev's version)
Friend to Giselle, Two Wilis (Giselle by A. Adam, choreography by J. Coralli, J. Perrot, M. Petipa, Y. Grigorovich's version)
Sylph/Sylphs (La Sylphide by H. Levenskiold, choreography by A. Bournonville in  version)
Soloist (I. Stravinsky's Jeu de cards, choreography by A. Ratmansky)

2006

Princess Aurora (The Sleeping Beauty)
Autumn, Waltz Soloist/Soloists, Cinderella (S. Prokofiev's Cinderella, choreography by Y. Possokhov, director Y. Borisov) — creation
Lyuska (D. Shostakovich's The Golden Age, choreography by Y. Grigorovich)
Tchaikovsky Pas de Deux (choreography by G. Balanchine)
Gamzatti (La Bayadere) — debut on the Bolshoi Theatre tour to Monte-Carlo
Zina (The Bright Stream) — debut on the Bolshoi Theatre tour to Novosibirsk
Odette-Odile (Swan Lake)

2007

Soloist (In the Upper Room by P. Glass, choreography by T. Tharp)
Soloist (Misericordes to music by A. Part, choreography by C. Wheeldon)
The part in Class Concert (to music by A.Glazunov, A. Lyadov, A. Rubinstein, D. Shostakovich, choreography by A. Messerer)
Pas de Trois des Odalisques, Gulnare (Le Corsaire by A. Adam, production and new choreography by A. Ratmansky and Y. Burlaka after M. Petipa)

2008

The title part (H. Levenskiold's La Sylphide, choreography by A. Bournonville, J. Kobborg's version)
Amour (creation), Mireille de Poitiers (B. Asfiev's The Flames of Paris, production and new choreography by A. Ratmansky after V. Vainonen)
Kitri (Don Quixote)
Variation (Grand Pas classique for the ballet Paquita by L. Minkus, choreography by M. Petipa, new choreographic version by Y. Burlaka) — among the creators of this version of the ballet
The Couple in Violet (Russian Seasons by L. Desyatnikov, choreography by A. Ratmansky) — among the creators at the Bolshoi Theatre
Marie (Nutcracker)

2009

L’Aurore (Coppelia by L. Délibes, choreography by M. Petipa and E. Cecchetti; revival and new choreographic version by S. Vikharev) — creation at the Bolshoi Theatre
Aegina (A. Khachaturian's Spartacus, choreography by Y. Grigorovich)
The Couple in Yellow (Russian Seasons) — debut on the Bolshoi Theatre tour to St.Petersburg
Ballerina (The Bright Stream)
Fleur de Lys (C. Pugni's Esmeralda, choreography by M. Petipa, staging and new choreographic version by Y. Burlaka and V. Medvedev)

2010

The part in Serenade by P. Tchaikovsky (choreography by G. Balanchine)
Juliet (S. Prokofiev Romeo and Juliet, choreography by Y. Grigorovich )
Medora (Le Corsaire)
Paquita (Grand Pas classique for the ballet Paquita, new choreographic version by Y. Burlaka)
Aspiccia (La Fille du Pharaon)
The Leading Couple in Rubies (Part II of Jewels to music by I. Stransky, choreography by G. Balanchine)

2011

Florine (L. Desyatnikov's Lost Illusions, choreography by A. Ratmansky) — creation
Part in Chroma (music by Joby Talbot and Jack White, choreography by W. McGregor) — among the creators at the Bolshoi Theatre

2012

Giselle (Giselle in the version by Y. Grigorovich)
Jeanne (The Flames of Paris)
The Leading Couple in Diamonds (Part III of Jewels to music by P. Tchaikovsky, choreography by G. Balanchine)
The Leading Couple (Classical Symphony to music by S. Prokofiev, choreography by Y. Possokhov) — among the creators at the Bolshoi Theatre
Terpsichore (Apollon Musagète by I. Stravinsky, choreography by G. Balanchine)

2013

Nikia (La Bayadere)
Angela (Marco Spada to music by D.-F.-E. Auber, P. Lacotte's production)
Swanilda (Coppelia)

2014

Katharina (The Taming of the Shrew to music by D. Shostakovich, choreography by J.-C. Maillot) — creation
Mekhmene Banu (A Legend of Love)

2015

Coralie (Lost Illusions)

2016

Title part (Raymonda)
Part in Short time together to music by M. Richter and L. van Beethoven (choreography by P. Lightfoot and S. León) – among the creators at the Bolshoi Theatre
Ondine (Ondine by H. W. Henze, choreography by V. Samodurov)
Anyuta (Anyuta to music by V. Gavrilin, choreography by V. Vasiliev)
Rita (The Golden Age)

2017

Tatiana (Onegin to music by P. Tchaikovsky, choreography by J. Cranko)
Novice (The Cage to music by I. Stravinsky, choreography by J. Robbins)
Ballerina (Etudes to music by Carl Czerny, choreography by H. Lander) — creation at the Bolshoi Theatre
Carmen (Carmen Suite to music by G. Bizet-R. Shchedrin, A. Alonso production)
Juliet (Romeo and Juliet, choreography by A. Ratmansky) – creation at the Bolshoi Theatre

2018

Ballerina (Petrushka by I. Stravinsky, choreography by E. Clug) – creation

In 2007, she appeared in the ballet Old Ladies Falling Out to music by L. Desyatnikov (choreography by A. Ratmansky), which was shown first at the Territory Festival, and then under the auspices of the Studio of New Choreography workshop.

In 2011, she took part in a co-project of the Bolshoi Theatre and California Centre for the Arts (Remansos to music by E. Granados, choreography by Nacho Duato; Fractus to music by N. Chatham, choreography by K. Armitage; Pas de Trois to music by M. Glinka, choreography by G. Balanchine; Cinque to music by A. Vivaldi, choreography by M. Bigonzetti).

Tours
2009 – Medora in Le Corsaire with Bavarian State Ballet (Lukáš Slavický as Conrad);
Princess Aurora in The Sleeping Beauty In Kazan, with the Tatar Academic Theatre of Opera and Ballet within the framework of the Nureyev Ballet Festival (Kazan, Andrei Merkuriev as Prince Desiree).

2011 – Gamzatti in La Bayadere with the Tatar Opera and Ballet Theatre within the framework of the Nureyev Ballet Festival (Kazan);
Kitri in Don Quixote (R. Barra's production) with the Bavarian State Ballet (Basilio – Andrei Merkuriev, Flavio Salamanca, Lukáš Slavický); Odette/Odile in Swan Lake with Berlin State Ballet (P. Barra's production, Dinu Tamazlacaru as Prince Siegfried) and the title part in La Peri (choreography by V. Malakhov; Akhmed – Mikhail Kaniskin).
The same year she appeared at the star gala-concert in memoriam of Galina Ulanova from the Russian ballet icons cycle on the stage of the London Coliseum — there she danced pas de deux from The Flames of Paris opposite Vladislav Lantratov.

2015 – Don Quixote (Ernest Latypov as Basilio) and Swan Lake (Danila Korsuntsev as Prince Siegfried) at the Mariinsky Theatre; Odette/Odile in Swan Lake at the Mariinsky Theatre in the framework of XXIII Music Festival Stars of the White Nights (K. Sergeyev version, Danila Korsuntsev as Prince Siegfried).

2017 — Katharina (The Taming of the Shrew to music by D. Shostakovich, choreography by J.-C. Maillot) with Les Ballets de Monte-Carlo (Vladislav Lantratov as Petruchio).

Awards

In 2001, she won 1st prize at the Prix de Luxembourg International Ballet Competition and the 3rd at the International Ballet Competition in Moscow (Junior group, Soloists category).
In 2002, she won 3rd prize at Vaganova-Prix International Ballet Competition "Ваганова-prix" (Saint-Petersburg).
In 2005, she won 2nd prize at International Ballet Competition in Moscow.
In 2008, she was awarded the Ballet magazine Soul of Dance prize in the Rising Star category.
In 2013, she was awarded the title of People's Artist of the Republic of North Ossetia-Alania.
2015 – The Golden Mask National Theatre prize in the Best ballet female part category for her interpretation of the role of Katharina in The Taming of the Shrew; Positano Léonide Massine Prize (in the Dancer of the Year on the International Stage nomination).
2016 – the twined Prize Benois-Massine Moscow-Positano.
In 2018, Ekaterina Krysanova and Igor Tsvirko were awarded the prize of the international ballet festival Dance Open as "Best Duet";
awarded the title "Honored artist of the Russian Federation".

References

1985 births
Living people
Russian ballerinas
Dancers from Moscow
Bolshoi Ballet principal dancers
21st-century Russian ballet dancers
Prix Benois de la Danse winners